Ulaankhus (Red birch) is a sum (district) of Bayan-Ölgii Province in western Mongolia. It is primarily inhabited by ethnic Kazakhs. As of 2014 it had a population of 8010 people.

History
Historically, Ulaankhus was settled by Kazakhs who moved to the northern side of the Altai Mountains. In 1922, Sherushy khoshuun with the canter in Akbalshyk, currently Bilüü, was established. In 1922, it was split into Sherushy and Shebaraigyr, and in 1925 into Sherushy, Shebaraigyr, Botakara, and Zhantekey. These khoshuuns belonged to Khovd Province. In 1938, Sherushy khoshuun was renamed Ulaankhus sum. In 1940, Bayan-Ölgii Province was established, and the sum was subordinated to this province.

Geography
Ulaankhus sum borders the Altai Republic of Russia to the north, Tsagaannuur to the northeast, Bugat to the east, Sagsai to the southeast, Altay Prefecture of Xinjiang, China to the southwest, and Tsengel to the west. The sum is covered by hills and nmountains, with 90% of the area lying at altitudes above . The highest point is the Besbogda Mountain.

The Khovd River flows through the district, flowing through the town of  Bilüü.

Administrative divisions
The sum contains 8 bagtai:

Ikh-Oigor
Khökh khötöl
Khuljaa
Sogoog
Bayanzürkh
Dayan
Bilüü-1
Bilüü-2

Landmarks
Bilüü contains the Nurbergen Supermarket, a branch of the Khan Bank, a small stadium, a hotel, a school and a hospital.

Culture
More than 60 Pazyryk culture burials were discovered in Ulaankhus and Tsengel sums during an expedition in 2004. The area contains numerous rock paintings of hunters.

References

External links
touristinfocenter.mn 
Monsame.mn

Populated places in Mongolia
Districts of Bayan-Ölgii Province